The Democratic Reconstruction (Spanish: Reconstrucción Democrática) is a minor Peruvian political party. At the legislative elections held on  9 April 2006, the party won less than 1% of the popular vote and no seats in the Congress of the Republic.

Political parties in Peru
Political parties with year of establishment missing